Pinhal is a municipality in the state of Rio Grande do Sul, Brazil. It is situated at 368 m above sea level and its estimated population in 2020 was 2,580. It has an area of 72,6 km²

See also
List of municipalities in Rio Grande do Sul

References

Municipalities in Rio Grande do Sul